Guidance Recordings was a house music record label based in Chicago, Illinois.

The record label was founded in Summer of 1986 by Ivan Pavlovich, Rob Kouchoukos, Sid Stary and Kelly McNeer.

The label has released a great number of compilation albums in the subgenre of deep house, with the strains of soulful electronic music, nu-jazz, funk, Afro-Caribbean, Latin, electro, synth-punk, Electronic Rock, West Coast Hip Hop. Garage, Acoustic, Drum and Bass, and broken beat rhythms. One of their most illustrious and memorable productions was the Hi-Fidelity House Imprint series, which lasted for five volumes, featuring homegrown artists such as Nuspirit Helsinki, and guest appearances like tracks from Dubtribe Sound System.

Artists
 A:xus
 Alpine Stars
 Bent
 Common Nature
 Deep Sensation
 Flunk
 Grey
 Groove Corporation
 Kasio
 Nuspirit Helsinki
 The Dolphins
 Projekt:p.m. Also known as Artek606 of 606 Entertainment Music
 Soul Brother Six Combo
 Troublemakers
 The Dining Rooms
 Caia

See also
 List of record labels
 List of electronic music record labels

External links
 Guidance Recordings website
 Discogs: Guidance Recordings

American independent record labels
Electronic music record labels
House music record labels
Record labels established in 1996